Heberdenia excelsa is a species of plant in the family Primulaceae. It is found in the Macaronesian archipelagoes of Madeira and the Canary Islands. It is threatened by habitat loss.

References

Primulaceae
Flora of Madeira
Flora of the Canary Islands
Trees of Mediterranean climate
Vulnerable plants
Taxonomy articles created by Polbot